Liu Ying (born June 11, 1974) is a Chinese association football player who competed in the 1996 and 2000 Summer Olympics.

In 1996 she won the silver medal with the Chinese team. She played three matches including the final. She played with the 1999 FIFA Women's World Cup team that lost to the United States in the final. The match went to penalties, and she was the only player on either side to miss her chance, as her kick was saved by Briana Scurry. The U.S. ultimately won the shoot-out 5–4.  One year later she was a member of the Chinese team which finished fifth in the women's tournament at the 2000 Summer Olympics. She played all three matches.

External links

Profile

1974 births
Living people
Chinese women's footballers
Footballers at the 1996 Summer Olympics
Footballers at the 2000 Summer Olympics
Olympic footballers of China
Olympic silver medalists for China
Olympic medalists in football
Asian Games medalists in football
Footballers at the 1998 Asian Games
Medalists at the 1996 Summer Olympics
China women's international footballers
Asian Games gold medalists for China
Women's association footballers not categorized by position
Medalists at the 1998 Asian Games
1999 FIFA Women's World Cup players
2003 FIFA Women's World Cup players
FIFA Century Club
High School Affiliated to Renmin University of China alumni